Ditunshimakhi (Dargwa: ДитӀуншимахьи) is a rural locality (a selo) in Kakamakhinsky Selsoviet, Levashinsky District, Republic of Dagestan, Russia. The population was 489 as of 2010. There are 2 streets.

Geography 
Ditunshimakhi is located 7 km southwest of Levashi (the district's administrative centre) by road. Kakamakhi and Kusamakhi are the nearest rural localities.

Nationalities 
Dargins live there.

References 

Rural localities in Levashinsky District